William Forbes-Sempill may refer to:
 William Forbes-Sempill, 19th Lord Sempill, Scottish peer and air pioneer
 William Forbes-Sempill, 17th Lord Sempill, Scottish peer